The Company of Wolves is a 1984 British gothic fantasy horror film directed by Neil Jordan and starring Angela Lansbury, David Warner, Micha Bergese and Sarah Patterson in her film debut. The screenplay was written by Jordan and Angela Carter, and adapted by Carter from her short story of the same name (featured in her 1979 short story collection The Bloody Chamber) and its 1980 radio adaptation. Carter's first draft of the screenplay, which contains some differences from the finished film, has been published in her anthology The Curious Room (1996).

Plot
The film begins in the present day, within a country house. A young girl named Rosaleen (Sarah Patterson) dreams that she lives in a fairytale forest during the late 18th century with her parents (Tusse Silberg and David Warner) and sister Alice (Georgia Slowe). But one night Alice is chased down and killed by wolves. While her parents are mourning, Rosaleen goes to stay with her grandmother (Angela Lansbury), who knits a bright red shawl for her granddaughter to wear. The superstitious old woman gives Rosaleen an ominous warning, "Never stray from the path, never eat a windfall apple, and never trust a man whose eyebrows meet." Rosaleen returns to her village, but finds that she must deal with the advances of an amorous boy (Shane Johnstone). Rosaleen and the boy take a walk through the forest, but the boy discovers that the village's cattle have come under attack from a wolf. The villagers set out to hunt the wolf; but once caught and killed, the wolf's corpse transforms into that of a human being.

Rosaleen later takes a basket of goods through the woods to her grandmother's cottage; but on her way, she encounters an attractive huntsman (Micha Bergese) whose eyebrows meet. He challenges her, saying that he can find his way to her grandmother's house before she can, and the pair set off. The hunter arrives at Rosaleen's grandmother's house first, where he reveals his bestial nature and kills her. Rosaleen arrives later and discovers the carnage, but her need to protect herself is complicated by her desire for the hunter. In the ensuing exchange, Rosaleen accidentally injures the huntsman with his own rifle. Upon this blow, the hunter contorts in pain and transforms into his wolf shape. A deeply remorseful Rosaleen apologizes and takes pity on the wounded beast, musing that his pack could leave him behind in his state. She sits down and begins petting the wolf caringly and tenderly, comforting him while telling him a story.

Ultimately the villagers arrive at the house sometime later, looking for a werewolf within. Instead, they discover that Rosaleen herself has become a werewolf. Together, she and the huntsman, her new mate, escape to the forest, joined by a growing pack. The wolves seem to stream into the real world, breaking into Rosaleen's house and gathering outside her bedroom. Rosaleen awakes with a scream as one leaps in through the window and sends her toys crashing to the floor, symbolizing the end of her childhood innocence.

Perrault's Le Petit Chaperon Rouge is then heard being read, with the moral warning girls to beware of charming strangers.

Granny's tales and Rosaleen's stories
Throughout the course of the film, a number of stories are interspersed into the main narrative as tales told by several of the characters:

 Granny's tale to Rosaleen—A young groom (Stephen Rea) whose eyebrows meet is about to bed his new bride (Kathryn Pogson) when a "call of nature" summons him outside. He disappears and his bride is terrified to see wolves howling outside. A search the following day yields a wolf pawprint only. Believing he was killed by wolves while going to the bathroom, she remarries and has children, only to have her original husband finally return years later. Angered at her having children with a new husband, the groom transforms into his werewolf form, but is killed when the new husband (Jim Carter) returns.
 Granny's second tale to Rosaleen—A young man whose eyebrows meet, the bastard son of a priest, is walking through the enchanted forest when he encounters the Devil (Terence Stamp), anachronistically arriving in a Rolls-Royce chauffeured by the actress playing Rosaleen in a blonde wig. The Devil offers the boy a transformative potion, which he rubs onto his chest, causing hair to sprout rapidly. The boy is pleased, but shortly thereafter vines grow swiftly from the ground, twining around his legs and trapping him. He wails in protest and fear, his face distorting with his cries. His anguished visage appearing in Rosaleen's bedroom mirror at the end of that dream sequence.
 Rosaleen's story to her mother—A woman (Dawn Archibald) who lived in a valley "done a terrible wrong" by a rich, young nobleman (Richard Morant) turns up visibly pregnant at his wedding party "to put wrong to right". She calls out the nobleman and the rest of the nobles for their bigoted actions, and further denounces them by declaring "the wolves in the forest are more decent". She then reveals that she is an enchantress and magically transforms the groom, the bride, and all the other nobles into wolves. They flee into the forest as the enchantress laughs; but afterward, the enchantress commands that the wolves "serenade" her and her child each night.
 Rosaleen's story to the huntsman/wolf—A she-wolf from the world beneath arrives at a village. Despite meaning no harm, she is shot and injured by a villager. She reveals herself in her human form (Danielle Dax) to an old priest (Graham Crowden) who takes her in and bandages her wound, seeing her innocence. Although touched by the priest's compassion and actions, she feels that she is not fit to stay. Ultimately, after some time, she returns to her world through the village well.

Cast
Sarah Patterson as Rosaleen
Angela Lansbury as Granny
David Warner as Father
Tusse Silberg as Mother
Micha Bergese as Huntsman (his first role in a feature film)
Brian Glover as Amorous Boy's father
Graham Crowden as Old Priest
Kathryn Pogson as Young Bride
Stephen Rea as Young Groom
Georgia Slowe as Alice, Girl Killed by Wolves
Susan Porrett as Amorous Boy's mother
Shane Johnstone as Amorous Boy
Dawn Archibald as Witch Woman
Richard Morant as Wealthy Groom
Danielle Dax as Wolfgirl (a non-speaking role)
Jim Carter as Second Husband (uncredited)
Terence Stamp as The Devil (uncredited)

Production

Writing
Angela Carter, author of the original short story "The Company of Wolves", worked with director Neil Jordan on the script for the film. This was Carter's first experience of writing for film. However, it was also only Jordan's second feature film as director.

Carter and Jordan met in Dublin in 1982 to discuss extending Carter's radio drama adaptation of her own story, which Jordan called "too short for a feature film".

In an L.A. Weekly interview published to correspond with the film's US debut, Jordan said: "In a normal film you have a story with different movements that program, develop, go a little bit off the trunk, come back, and end. In this film, the different movements of the plot are actually separate stories. You start with an introduction and then move into different stories that relate to the main theme, all building to the fairy tale that everybody knows. The opening element of the dreamer gave us the freedom to move from story to story." 

The script reached its third draft by July 1983.

Carter's proposed ending for the film would have featured Rosaleen diving into the floor of her bedroom and being swallowed up as by water. In the DVD commentary for the film, Jordan claimed that the limited technology of the time prevented the production of such a sequence, whereas later CGI effects would in fact make it quite simple. However, in 1929 Jean Cocteau, using film technology that was more than half a century older, included a scene in his film The Blood of a Poet in which a character "passes through a mirror" (in actuality, a pool of water). The original screenplay of The Company of Wolves (as presented in The Curious Room) also featured an additional story being told by the huntsman, a very different final tale by Rosaleen (reminiscent of Carter's "Peter and the Wolf" from her collection Black Venus) and a scene set in a church with an animal congregation.

The budget was provided by ITC Distributors.

Principal photography
The Company of Wolves was filmed in Shepperton Studios in England. The film's cast was primarily made up of British actors. Sarah Patterson made her screen debut, despite being much younger than the kind of actress the casting director had been looking for, and likely too young to understand some of the film's more adult concepts. Her youth also meant having to make special arrangements with her school in order for her to be away for nine weeks while shooting took place. Northern Irish actor Stephen Rea had already worked with director Neil Jordan in Angel and would later work with him again in The Crying Game, Interview with the Vampire and Breakfast on Pluto, amongst others.

Jordan worked for several weeks in pre-production with artist filmmakers Nichola Bruce and Michael Coulson to create hundreds of detailed storyboard drawings. Also involved with production was production designer Anton Furst and his draftsman Nigel Phelps, who would later go on to work on Tim Burton's Batman. The film's visuals were of particular importance, as Jordan explains:The visual design was an integral part of the script. It was written and imagined with a heightened sense of reality in mind. In the DVD commentary, Jordan notes the difficulty of having to create the look of the film on a limited budget, having to create a fairytale forest out of essentially "twelve trees". He nevertheless succeeded in creating a sunless, mystical, wondrous and claustrophobic setting saturated with fantastic elements and symbols.

The script calls for a great number of wolves to appear. Due to budgetary constraints and other factors such as cast safety, most of the 'wolves' shown in the film are in fact evidently Belgian Shepherd Dogs, mainly Terveurens and Groenendals, whose fur was specially dyed. In the DVD commentary for the film, Jordan notes the bravery of young star Sarah Patterson when acting amongst the genuine wolves. Using particular light angles, the eyes of both real and "shepherd" wolves are made to glow dramatically in the film.

Jordan notes how Carter was "thrilled with the process" of making a film, as she "had never really been involved with one." After the film, Jordan and Carter looked for other projects which they could work on together. However, no others came to fruition, partly because of Carter's later illness. According to Jordan, he and Carter discussed a possible adaptation of Vampirella, Carter's radio play which served as the original version of her short story "The Lady of the House of Love" from The Bloody Chamber. This is not to be confused with the actual film Vampirella, released in 1996 and based upon the comic book character of the same name.

Release
The film received its world premiere at the Toronto International Film Festival in Canada on 15 September 1984. It was released in the United Kingdom on 21 September and was released in the United States on 19 April 1985 where it was shown in 995 theatres.

Distribution
The film was distributed in the United States by Cannon Films. Jordan notes that Cannon pushed the concept of the film as primarily a horror film. Jordan maintains that it is not a horror film and that such a label might actually be misleading to audiences.

Home video
The film was later released on VHS in numerous countries. A Region 1 DVD release came several years later on 15 October 2002. A Region 2 special edition version of the film was released on 17 October 2005, approximately 20 years after the film's initial release in theatres. This special edition came in a metal case and included an audio commentary by director Neil Jordan, stills galleries, the film's theatrical trailer and a printed "Behind the Scenes Dossier". This special edition version was also released on Universal Media Disc for the Sony PlayStation Portable on 30 January 2006. The film was released on Blu-ray in 2007 in United Kingdom by ITV.

Reception

Critical response
Feminist critic Maggie Anwell decried the film for its over-emphasis on bloody werewolf special effects, but another, Charlotte Crofts, argues that the film is a sensitive adaptation of Carter's reworking of Charles Perrault's Little Red Riding Hood fairy tale.

Colin Greenland reviewed The Company of Wolves for Imagine magazine, and stated that "It's a Freudian fairytale with deliciously gruesome transformation scenes and deep, vigorous imagery, but not without twee patches."

In April 1985, upon the film's US debut, Roger Ebert gave the film three stars out of four, and called it a "disturbing and stylish attempt to collect some of the nightmares that lie beneath the surface of "'Little Red Riding Hood'".

Years later, Louise Watson, writing for BFI Screenonline, said Neil Jordan "evokes an eerie, dreamlike atmosphere for the film's heightened reality. Its otherworldly scenery and costumes seem to have been inspired by fairytale illustrations, mixed with the studio-bound visual style of Hammer horror. The Hammer-like theatrical forest creates a sense of brooding claustrophobia where no sunlight can reach, accentuating Rosaleen's trapped existence. An intensely visual film, teeming with rich symbolism and imagery... settings and special effects dominate the film, often at the expense of the (perhaps deliberately) underdeveloped characters."

Box office performance
Financially, the film only just broke even on its opening weekend in the US, having been made for approximately $2 million and taking $2,234,776 in 995 theatres. However, in total, the film took over $4 million in the US

It made £1,629,000 in the UK.

Awards and nominations
Critics generally responded especially positively to the film's aesthetics. The film won one award for best film and best special effects at the 1985 International Fantasy Film Awards and was nominated for four BAFTAs for costume design, make up, production design/art direction and special visual effects.

Won
Special Mention at the 1985 Fantafestival
Three 1985 Fantasporto awards:
Audience Jury Award
Critics' Award
1985 International Fantasy Film Award (Best Film and Best Special Effects)
1985 London Critics Circle Film Awards ALFS Award (Director of the Year: Neil Jordan)
Two 1985 Sitges - Catalan International Film Festival awards:
Caixa de Catalunya (Best Film and Best Special Effects)
Prize of the International Critics' Jury

Nominated
Grand Prize at the Avoriaz Fantastic Film Festival, 1985.
Four 1985 BAFTA Awards:
Best Costume Design (Elizabeth Waller)
Best Make Up Artist (Jane Royle, Christopher Tucker)
Best Production Design/Art Direction (Anton Furst)
Best Special Visual Effects (Christopher Tucker, Alan Whibley).

Soundtrack
A soundtrack album, featuring the George Fenton score from the film, was released in 1985 on Varèse Sarabande Records.

Soundtrack Album:

Side A:

1. "The Message And Main Theme"
2. "Rosaleen's First Dream"
3. "The Story Of The Bride And Groom: The Village Wedding/The Return Of The Groom"
4. "The Forest And The Huntsman's Theme"
5. "The Wedding Party"

Side B:

1. "The Boy And The Devil"
2. "One Sunday Afternoon"
3. "All The Better To Eat You With: Arriving At Granny's Cottage/The Promise And Transformation"
4. "The Wolfgirl"
5. "Liberation"

The soundtrack was later released on cd on That's Entertainment Records in the UK and Ireland in 1990 and then on Jay Records on cd in Europe in 2000.

See also
Valerie and Her Week of Wonders, a 1970 Czech surrealist film which also features a young girl who experiences a series of beautiful and perilous dreams inspired by her menarche.
Ginger Snaps, a 2000 Canadian film which also uses lycanthropy as a metaphor for an adolescent girl's burgeoning sexuality.
Red Riding Hood, Catherine Hardwicke's 2011 film which also replaces a werewolf for the wolf, and is a coming-of-age story about adolescence and sexual awakening.

References

External links

The Company of Wolves at Screenonline

Neil Jordan and Angela Carter in conversation – a British Library sound recording

British fantasy films
British werewolf films
1984 films
1984 horror films
1984 fantasy films
Dark fantasy films
1980s psychological horror films
Films about dreams
Films about nightmares
Films set in country houses
Films set in forests
Films set in the 18th century
Dramatic works by Angela Carter
Films scored by George Fenton
Films based on short fiction
Films based on Little Red Riding Hood
Films directed by Neil Jordan
ITC Entertainment films
Palace Pictures films
Period horror films
Folk horror films
Golan-Globus films
1980s monster movies
1980s English-language films
Films shot at Shepperton Studios
British anthology films
1980s British films